YTL may refer to:

 The IATA code for Big Trout Lake Airport.
 The code for New Turkish lira.
 YTL Corporation, a Malaysian firm.
 The York-Timbuktu Link
 YTL a Small District Harbor Tugboat